David Joseph Hutchison (born May 2, 1952) is a Canadian former professional ice hockey player. He played in the World Hockey Association from 1972 to 1974 and the National Hockey League from 1974 to 1984.

Playing career
Hutchison played for the Philadelphia Blazers and Vancouver Blazers of the World Hockey Association and the Los Angeles Kings, Toronto Maple Leafs, Chicago Black Hawks and New Jersey Devils of the National Hockey League. In 681 career professional games, he logged 1735 penalty minutes and 131 points, and often played in a defensive tandem with Börje Salming and Doug Wilson. He retired in 1984.

Career statistics

Regular season and playoffs

External links
 

1952 births
Living people
Canadian ice hockey defencemen
Chicago Blackhawks players
London Knights players
Los Angeles Kings draft picks
Los Angeles Kings players
New Jersey Devils players
Philadelphia Blazers players
Rhode Island Eagles players
Sportspeople from London, Ontario
Ice hockey people from Montreal
Toronto Maple Leafs players
Vancouver Blazers players
Wichita Wind players